Citharoceps is a genus of spiders in the family Segestriidae. It was first described in 1924 by Chamberlin.

Species
, the genus contained two species:
Citharoceps cruzana (Chamberlin & Ivie, 1935) - US
Citharoceps fidicina Chamberlin, 1924 - US, Mexico

References

Segestriidae
Araneomorphae genera
Spiders of North America